The Ukraine national under-21 speedway team is the national under-21 motorcycle speedway team of Ukraine and is controlled by the SVEMO. The team started in Under-21 World Cup only once, in 2005 season they losing in Qualifying Round Two. Riders from Ukraine never won a medal: of Individual Under-21 World Championship.

Competition

See also 
 Ukraine national speedway team

External links 
 List of National Motorcycle Federations in Europe

National speedway teams
Speedway
Team